Joan Triadu (30 July 1921 – 30 September 2010) was a Catalan literary critic, academic and writer. A cultural and resistant anti-Francoist activist, he participated in many significant Catalan cultural projects of the 20th century such as the Serra d'Or magazine, the magazine Ariel, the newspaper  Today  or Òmnium Cultural. He was the pioneer in the post-war teaching of Catalan courses.

Life
Triadu was born in a working family within the Spanish town of Ribes de Freser. He attended school and achieved the Baccalaureate in Barcelona in 1937, after undertaking an accelerated course convened by the Generalitat de Catalunya. The course was created, due to the large number of teachers that were conscripted for the Spanish Civil War, and the subsequent avalanche of refugees that were arriving. He passed the compulsory English exam and obtained the title of Catalan teacher, under the tutelage of Pompeu Fabra. In January 1938, he was appointed interim primary teacher by the Generalitat and assigned to the Granollers School of Education Francesc Ferrer i Guàrdia, where he held the position until the end of the war.

He was the father of Joaquim Triadú i Vila-Abadal, Minister of the Government of the Generalitat under president Jordi Pujol, and Teresa Triadú i Vila-Abadal, for many years, director of the Thau Sant Cugat School.

Career 
After the Spanish Civil War, the new authorities did not recognise the academic titles given prior to the start of the war and Triadú had to be reexamined again in 1939. During the 1939-1940 period, he matriculated at the University of Barcelona, where he studied Classical Philology. He also attended the University College of Catalonia. Triadu graduated in June 1942, but contracted tuberculosis afterwards and this forced him to follow a lengthy process of convalescence, first in Barcelona and from June 1943 in Cantonigròs.

Triadu returned to Barcelona in 1945, and after a period of working as a teacher in several schools and institutions, he moved to England where he became Catalan reader at the University of Liverpool between 1948 and 1950.

Literary criticism
Before leaving for England in 1946, he became one of the founders of the magazine Ariel, where he began his work as a literary critic. The magazine was published clandestinely until 1951, when it was suspended by the authorities.

Returned to England, his work as a critic took a new turn in 1951 with the publication of an Anthology of Catalan poetry 1900-1950 and an Anthology of Catalan contests ", which were controversial for the selection of authors and the critical comments that led to them. The 1953 published in Oxford an Anthology of Catalan lyric poetry, with an extensive introduction that published the same year in "Panorama of Catalan poetry."

The poet Carles Fages de Climent to be excluded by Triadú from this last anthology - apparently from the sectarianism of Triadú towards the conservatism of Fages - devoted this epigram: 

The writer Tomàs Roig i Llop, a great friend of Fages, offers, however, another version of this famous epigram:

Later, he continued to develop the facet of literature criticism in magazines, Forja, Pont Blau, Vida Nova, Serra d'Or, in the newspaper Today and in various local, county and entity publications.

Cultural promotion
During his convalescence, in 1944, he founded, together with Jordi Parcerisas, the Parish Contest of poetry of Catalonia, under the protection of the Roman Catholic Diocese of Vic  and with the complicity of the rector of the parish of Sant Roc d'Amer in Catalonia, especially Father Joseph Cruells and Rodellas from 1963. For this competition, they moved the main figures of Catalan literature and was an excellent platform for the continuity of the public task of established writers and the discovery of new values.

In 1954 he was one of the founders of the Barcelona Dramatic Association.

From 1969 he was the architect of the transformation Cantonigròs poetry contest in the popular Festival of culture Pompeu Fabra, which developed up to the year 1993.

Triadú's preoccupation with the Catalan language led him to develop as a teacher of Catalan and to become interested more in the training of teachers of Catalan language and Catalan literature. For this reason, the Catalan Advisory Board for Catalan Studies (JAEC) launched in 1961. He was a member of the Òmnium Cultural since 1962, association that promoted the Catalan language,  and for many years was the Technical Secretary general, complementing the work of the JAEC with the founding of the delegation of Teaching Catalan (DEC), in 1965. While part of the Òmnium Cultural, he participated in the gestation and organisation of the Premi Sant Jordi de novel·la Prize and the prize of honour of Catalan letters. Once recovered from the Generalitat de Catalunya, he became a member of the Board of education and culture and president of the Permanent Board of Catalan.

Another important task was to support the Floral Games of the Catalan Language in exile. He participated in several editions, one of which in 1972, that took place in Geneva, resulted in him receiving the imposition of large fine, given to him by the Spanish authorities.

Triadú was also a founder, in 1975, of the Catalan Council of education and later the first president of the Societat Catalana de Pedagogia, a subsidiary of the Institut d'Estudis Catalans.

Death
He died on 30 September 2010 in Barcelona. His funeral was held in the parish of Barcelona of Santa Teresa of the Infant Jesus, with his coat covered by the Catalan flag and heard by squadron masters in a gala uniform. His remains rest at the Cantonigròs cemetery.

Exhibition
In January 2013 a commemorative travelling exhibition was inaugurated at the Palau Robert in Barcelona, that was curated by Joan Josep Isern and Susanna Àlvarez. It is a project of the Generalitat de Catalunya and the Fundació Flos and designed to remember and at the same time to pay a tribute to the teacher, writer and cultural activist. The exhibition is entitled Read how to live. Tribute to Joan Triadú. 1921-2010. The opening of the exhibition and the audiovisual projection about Joan Triadú took place on Thursday, January 17, at 7 pm, with the presence of the Minister for the Presidency, Francisco Homs. Also present, among other authorities, were the general manager of citizen attention and dissemination, Ignasi Genovese, the president of the Foundation for Flos and minutely calculated and son of the honoree, Joaquim Triadú, as well as other family members and personalities from the world of education and literature.

The show is in the first person, on the basis of selected texts from the memories of a golden age, a text by Joan Triadú, combining the biographical genre with the memorialístic. The content of the exhibition is developed in these areas: who i am and why I write; I come from that I say "below"; All you have to do as if it were the last time; Demanding in poetry; In the middle way of life; Teacher is the one who frees us, and read how to live. The sample provides a lot of information about his life and presents excerpts from his works, personal items, a selection of letters of intellectuals such as Carles Riba, Mercè Rodoreda, Baltasar Porcel ... and an audiovisual in which Joan Triadú tells his life and professional career. The exhibition has continuity in the garden with a selection of texts by Joan Triadú that highlight the importance given to education as a means to change and improve the people.

Honours, prizes and distinctions
Just after the Spanish Civil War, he collaborated on the National Front of Catalonia in the writing of articles in the Bulletin of Catalonia. Throughout Francoist Spain he actively participated in the Catalan cultural resistance against the dictatorship.

He was a member of the International Association of Catalan Language and Literature, the PEN Club, the Association of Catalan Language Writers (AELC) and the Institut d'Estudis Catalans, as well as the Advisory Board of the Platform for the Language.

In 1978 he was elected an associate member of the Institute of Catalan Studies.

Honours
 In 1981 he received the first prize Ramon Fuster, from the College of Doctors and Graduates in Philosophy and Arts and Sciences of Catalonia, for his work as a teacher. 
 In 1982 he was awarded the Creu de Sant Jordi Award of the Generalitat de Catalunya.
 In 1987, the Guild of Editors awarded him the Atlantis prize, for his work as a literary critic. 
 In 1992 he won the Honor Prize for Catalan Letters.
 In 1997 the city council of Barcelona awarded him the Medal for Scientific Merit. 
 In 1998 he was awarded an Honorary Doctorate by the Ramon Llull University
 In 2001 he was distinguished with the Gold Medal of the Generalitat of Catalonia. 
 In 2009 his memo book Memories of a Golden Age won the Serra d'Or Critics Award for biographies and memoirs.

Bibliography

Poetry
 1948: Endimió. Barcelona: Ariadna.
 1956: El Collsacabra. Barcelona: Els Cinquanta-Cinc.

Works of Literary criticism

 Panorama of Catalan poetry, Panorama de la poesia catalana. 1953 Barcelona: Barcino.
 The poetry according to Carles Riba, La poesia segons Carles Riba. 1954 Barcelona: Barcino.
 La l, iteratura catalana i el poble. 1961 Barcelona: Selecta.
 Llegir com viure. 1963 Barcelona: Fontanella.
 Prudenci Bertrana per ell mateix. 1967 Barcelona: Ed. 62.
 Lectures escollides. 1969 Barcelona: Barcino.
 Una cultura sense llibertat. 1978 Barcelona: Proa.
 La novel·la catalana de postguerra. 1982 Barcelona: Ed. 62.
 La poesia catalana de postguerra. 1985 Barcelona: Ed. 62.
 Per comprendre Carles Riba. 1993 Manresa.
 La ciutat dels llibres. 1999 Barcelona: Proa.

Biography
 1954: Narcís Oller. Barcelona: Barcino.

Memoirs
 2001: Dies de memòria 1938-1940. Barcelona: Proa.

Anthologies
 2003: 100 poesies catalanes que cal conèixer. De Verdaguer a M. Mercè Marçal. Barcelona: Pòrtic.

References

External links 
 Joan Triadú en la Asociació de Escritores en Lengua Catalana, AELC. En catalán, castellano e inglés.
 Página dedicada a Joan Triadú, en lletrA, el espacio de literatura catalana de la Universitat Oberta de Catalunya, en catalán.
 Triadú, l’entrevista imaginada

1921 births
2010 deaths
20th-century Spanish historians
University of Barcelona alumni
Writers from Catalonia
Catalan-language writers
Spanish expatriates in the United Kingdom
Teachers of Catalan